Thiruengoimalai  Maragadachaleswarar  Temple is a Hindu temple located at Eengoimalai in Trichy district of Tamil Nadu, India.  The presiding deity is Shiva. He is called as Maragadachaleswarar and Eengoinathar. His consort is Maragadambikai.

As per a legend, Vayu Bhaghvan and Adiseshan had a dispute to find out who is superior, to prove the superiority adiseshan encircled the Kailasam, Vayu tried to remove this encircle by creating santamarutham (Twister). Because of the santamarutham, 8 kodumudigal (parts) fell from kailasam into 8 different places which are Thirugonamalai, Sri Lanka, Thirukalahasti, Thiruchiramalai, Thiruengoimalai or Thiruenkoimalai, Rajathagiri, Neerthagiri, Ratnagiri, and Suwethagiri or Thirupangeeli.

Significance 
It is one of the shrines of the 275 Paadal Petra Sthalams - Shiva Sthalams glorified in the early medieval Tevaram poems by Tamil Saivite Nayanar Tirugnanasambandar.

Literary Mention 
Tirugnanasambandar describes the feature of the deity as:

References 

 
 

Shiva temples in Tiruchirappalli district
Padal Petra Stalam